{{Infobox television
| starring                 = Chris Jarvis
| opentheme                = "Theme - Step Inside"<small>From [https://www.amazon.co.uk/CBeebies-Official-Album-Various-Artists/dp/B00007B4EH CBeebies: The Official Album] (Track 22)</small>
| music                    = Jonathan Cohen
| country                  = United Kingdom
| num_episodes             = 50
| runtime                  = 9 minutes per episode (approx.)
| company                  = Tricorn Productions
| network                  = CBeebies
| first_aired              = 
| last_aired               = 
| image                    = Step_Inside,_BBC_Children’s_show,_title_card.jpeg
| voices                   = Sue DacreLynn Robertson Bruce
| channel                  = CBeebies
| caption                  = The title card of the show
}}Step Inside is a British children's television programme produced by Tricorn Productions for CBeebies in 2001 before the channel's launch, and aired between February and April 2002. It last reran in July 2010. There have been no VHS or DVD releases of the show, but all of the episodes have surfaced online apart from "A Bun for Barney".

The only human character in the show is Mr Mopple (portrayed by Chris Jarvis), a groundsman. Whilst doing his jobs, Mr Mopple unknowingly hears a noise from the house which tells him there must be a story to be narrated. The house magically appears to come to life with a superimposed puppet face appearing on the house. As he steps inside, a face appearing on the outside wall saying, "Step inside, all those who love stories, look and listen, we've tales to tell of fun, excitement, magic, adventure, tears, fears and laughter. Surprises as well. Step Inside."

Inside the house are the non-human characters, which use a mix of animated faces and puppet hands:
Twinkle, an animated cat
Boris, an anthropomorphised bookcase
Chloe, an anthropomorphic clock

Boris, the bookcase, provides a book, and Mr Mopple sits down to narrate the story. The characters themselves often argue among themselves, along with Mr Mopple keeping the peace. Mr Mopple provides an array of voices for every character in the book while narrating. When Mr Mopple has finished narrating the story, he leaves the magic house, (despite the face on the outside wall closing its eyes and disappearing entirely) and goes back to work.

Episodes, authors and illustrators
These are the episodes book titles, authors & illustrators for each episode.

Pass the Jam, Jim: Kaye Umansky and Margaret Chamberlain
When Will It Be Spring?: Catherine Walters
Lucky Mucky Pup: Ken Brown
You Can Swim, Jim: Kaye Umansky & Margaret Chamberlain 
The Ugly Duckling: Ian Beck
Is That What Friends Do?: Marjorie Newman & Peter Bowman
Chicken, Chips and Peas: Allan Ahlberg & Andre Amstutz
A Duck So Small: A.H. Benjamin & Elisabeth Holstien
The Jelly Monster: Mike Ratnett & Jonathan Bentley
I Don't Want to Have a Bath: Julie Sykes & Selina Young
Grandmother and I: Helen E. Buckley & Jan Ormerod
Pig Trouble: Barbara Mossmann & Werner Farber 
Oonga Boonga: Frieda Wishinsky and Carol Thompson
Farmer Duck: Martin Waddell & Helen Oxenbury
The Best Loved Bear: Diana Noonan & Elizabeth Fuller 
Dad! I Can't Sleep: Michael Foreman
I Want a Cat: Tony Ross
The Scarecrow's Hat: Ken Brown
Stone Soup: Tony Ross
Look! Look!: Michael Foreman
Stripe: Joanne Partis
Flop-Ear:  Guido Van Genechten
Bear's Eggs: Ingrid and Dieter Schubert
Isabel's Noisy Tummy: David McKee
Rum-Te-Tum Ted: Sally Grindley & Peter Utton
The Gruffalo: Julia Donaldson & Axel Scheffler
Something Special: Nicola Moon & Alex Ayliffe
Little Blue Car: Gwen Grant & Susan Hellard
A Summery Saturday Morning: Margaret Mahy & Selina Young
My G-r-r-r-r-reat Uncle Tiger: James Riordan & Alex Ayliffe
Little Mouse and the Big Red Apple: A.H. Benjamin & Gwyneth Williamson
Charlie's Choice: Nicola Smee
All By Myself: Ivan Bates
Scraps: Mark Foreman
Not Now, Bernard: David McKee
Blue Rabbit and Friends: Chris Wormell 
Pete and Polo and the Washday Adventure: Adrian Reynolds 
Tidy Up, Trevor: Rob Lewis
Super Dooper Jezebel: Tony Ross
The Lion and the Mouse: Aesop and Bernadette Watts
The Perfect Pet: Peta Coplans 
The Great Goat Chase: Tony Bonning and Sally Hobson
Mum's Late: Elizabeth Hawkins
Need a Trim, Jim: Kaye Umansky & Margaret Chamberlain
Mrs Mopple's Washing Line: Anita Hewett and Robert Broomfield
Home Before Dark: Ian Beck
Mr Davies and the Baby: Charlotte Voake
Don't Do That!: Tony Ross
A Bun for Barney: Joyce Dunbar & Emilie Boon
Please, Princess Primrose!: Vivian French and Chris Fisher

References 

2002 British television series debuts
2002 British television series endings
2000s British children's television series
British preschool education television series
British television shows featuring puppetry
2000s preschool education television series
Television series by BBC Studios
BBC children's television shows
English-language television shows
Animatronics
CBeebies